The 2012 UCI Cyclo-cross World Championships is the World Championship for cyclo-cross. It took place in Koksijde, Belgium on the weekend of January 28 and 29, 2012. As in the previous years, four events were scheduled. The event was the biggest Cyclo-cross World Championship yet, in terms of attendance. About 61000 people headed down to Koksijde on Sunday for the main event.

Medal table

Medal summary

Notes

External links

 WK Veldrijden profs (Dutch)
 UCI overview of the season
 Men's Elite Results at UCI site
 Women's Elite Results at UCI site
 Men's Elite results and report at cyclingnews.com

 
Uci Cyclo-cross World Championships, 2012
UCI Cyclo-cross
UCI Cyclo-cross World Championships
International cycle races hosted by Belgium
Sport in Koksijde
January 2012 sports events in Europe